Louisa Fleetwood Horton (September 20, 1920 – January 25, 2008) was an American film, television and stage actress, who used her given name, Louisa Horton, professionally. She was the former wife of the late The Sting director, George Roy Hill, with whom she had four children.

Personal life 
Horton was born to Jeter Rice and Frances Breckinridge (née Steele) Horton in Beijing, China. The daughter of a United States Marine Corps officer, she was raised in Haiti and the area around Washington, D.C. She lived in Manhattan for nearly 50 years before her death in 2008.

Marriage 
Horton met her husband George Roy Hill when they were both actors in a Shakespeare repertory company. They were married in 1951, and had four children, but divorced in the 1970s. They reportedly remained close even after their separation. George Roy Hill, who was best known for directing the 1973's The Sting, an Oscar-winning film, as well as 1969's Butch Cassidy and the Sundance Kid, died in 2002.

Career 

Horton made her feature film debut in All My Sons in 1948, opposite Edward G. Robinson and Burt Lancaster in a film based upon the play by Arthur Miller. Her additional film credits included Swashbuckler, a 1976 film starring James Earl Jones and Robert Shaw.

She made her Broadway debut in 1946, playing the lead in the romantic comedy The Voice of the Turtle. She later received attention for her role as the mother of a lesbian daughter in the off-Broadway play The Blessing in 1989.

Her television roles include many live television series.

Death 
Louisa Horton Hill died on January 25, 2008, at the Lillian Booth Actors' Fund Home in Englewood, New Jersey, aged 87. She was survived by four children and 12 grandchildren.

Filmography

References

External links 

1920 births
2008 deaths
People from Manhattan
People from Englewood, New Jersey
American television actresses
American stage actresses
American film actresses
20th-century American actresses
American expatriates in China
American expatriates in Haiti
21st-century American women